Letitia Plummer is a Texas politician who currently represents At-Large Position 4 of Houston City Council. She is the first Muslim to be elected to the council.

Personal life
Plummer was born in Boston, Massachusetts to a Yemeni-Indian mother and an African American father. The family moved to Houston in 1973, and Plummer attended Houston Independent School District where she graduated from DeBakey High School for Health Professions, formerly known as The High School for Health Professionals. After high school, she attended the historically black college Spelman College where she was a member of the Alpha Kappa Alpha sorority. She then returned to Texas and attended Baylor College of Dentistry and became a practicing dentist. She owns 2 dental practices in the Houston Metropolitan area, and has been recognized with the “Top Professionals on the Fast Track” and “Houston’s Top Dentist” awards. Plummer has 3 sons and is a practicing Muslim.

Political career
Plummer first ran for political office in 2018, competing for the Democratic nomination to represent the 22nd congressional district of Texas. She was defeated in the primary by former diplomat Sri Preston Kulkarni.

Plummer was first elected to political office, Houston City Council, in December 2019. She won 51.9% of the vote against her opponent Anthony Dolcefino and is the first Muslim to be elected to Houston City Council. She was sworn in on January 2, 2020 to represent At-Large Position 4 of Houston City Council succeeding Amanda Edwards, who ran for Senate. Plummer is affiliated with the Democratic Party.

References

Houston City Council members
Living people
Texas Democrats
American Muslims
Politicians from Boston
American dentists
Spelman College alumni
Year of birth missing (living people)
Women city councillors in Texas
African-American city council members in Texas
American people of Yemeni descent